Municipio XI (or Municipality 11) is one of the 15 administrative subdivisions of the city of Rome in Italy.

References

External links 

Municipi of Rome